Alfred Stelzner (29 November 1852 – 9 July 1906) was a German composer and luthier.

Stelzner was born in Hamburg, Germany, and educated in music, physics and mathematics. He produced string instruments of his own design in Wiesbaden and then in Dresden. Two instruments of his invention were the violotta and the cellone. The violotta is tuned an octave below the violin, and possesses a timbre between that of the viola and cello. The cellone, a large cello, is tuned between the cello and string bass.

Stelzner began production of his new instruments in 1889 and continued to make them until 1900. He vigorously promoted his instruments through advertising and obtained endorsements from many famous musicians of the day, including Joseph Joachim, Eugène Ysaÿe, David Popper, and August Wilhelmj. In addition, he helped sponsor competitions in various categories such as symphonies, opera and chamber music.

Stelzner's company eventually failed and entered bankruptcy. Faced with overwhelming financial difficulties, Stelzner committed suicide at his home in Dresden in 1906.

References

 J. Christensen. "Dr Stelzner's original instruments", The Strad 112:1120–1127 (2001)

1852 births
1906 suicides
Musicians from Dresden
Suicides in Germany
German opera composers
Male opera composers
Bowed string instrument makers
German male classical composers
19th-century German musicians
19th-century German male musicians
1906 deaths